The Oven of Akhnai is a Talmudic story found in Bava Metzia 59a-b which is set around the early 2nd century CE. In the Talmud, the story is told after a discussion of being careful not to mistreat a person and the power of prayers which are said in pain to be heard by God. The story concerns a debate which was held over the halakhic status of a new type of oven. In the course of the rabbinic disagreement, the story expresses differing views of the nature of law and authority, concerns over a fractured and divisive community, and the issue of harming another person through words and actions.

Story 
A new type of oven is brought before the Sanhedrin, consisting of tiles separated from one another by sand, but externally plastered over with cement. The rabbis debate whether or not this oven is susceptible to ritual impurity. Rabbi Eliezer ben Hurcanus argues that the oven is ritually pure while the other rabbis, including the nasi Rabban Gamaliel, argue that the oven is impure. When none of Rabbi Eliezer's arguments convince his colleagues, he cries out, "If the halakha is in accordance with my opinion, this carob tree will prove it."  At this point, the carob tree leaps from the ground and moves far away.  The other rabbis explain that a carob tree offers no proof in a debate over law.  Rabbi Eliezer cries out, "If the halakha is in accordance with my opinion, the stream will prove it." The stream begins to flow backwards, but again the other rabbis point out that one does not cite a stream as proof in matters of law.  Rabbi Eliezer cries out, "If the halakha is in accordance with my opinion, the walls of the study hall will prove it." The walls of the study hall begin to fall, but are then scolded by Rabbi Joshua ben Hananiah who reprimands the walls for interfering in a debate among scholars. Out of respect for Rabbi Joshua, they do not continue to fall, but out of respect for Rabbi Eliezer, they do not return to their original places.

In frustration, Rabbi Eliezer finally cries out, "If the halakha is in accordance with my opinion, Heaven will prove it." From Heaven a voice is heard, saying, "Why are you differing with Rabbi Eliezer, as the halakha is in accordance with his opinion in every place that he expresses an opinion?" Rabbi Joshua responds, "It [the Torah] is not in heaven" (Deuteronomy 30:12).  He responds in this way because the Torah, which was given by God to mankind at Sinai, specifically instructs those who follow it that they are to look to the received Torah as their source and guide. The Torah says, "It is not in heaven, that you should say, 'Who will go up to heaven for us, and get it for us so that we may hear it and observe it?' Neither is it beyond the sea, that you should say, 'Who will cross to the other side of the sea for us, and get it for us so that we may hear it and observe it?' No, the word is very near to you; it is in your mouth and in your heart for you to observe" (Deuteronomy 30:12-14).

Rabbi Joshua's response then expresses the view that the work of law is a work of human activity, and that the Torah itself supports this legal theory.  The Torah is not a document of mystery which must have its innate meaning revealed by a minority, but it is instead a document from which law must be created through the human activity of debate and consensus. Rabbinic literature was capable of recognizing differing opinions as having a degree of legitimacy (Yer. Ber. 3b), yet the community remains united and the ruling which is ultimately followed comes through proper jurisprudence.  As such, Rabbi Eliezer's miraculous appeals represent a differing legal theory and were outside of proper jurisprudence which meant that they would not be followed. Instead the Jewish community followed the ruling of the majority in this issue and in others. The Talmud asks how God responded to this incident.  We are told that upon hearing Rabbi Joshua's response, God smiled and stated, "My children have triumphed over Me; My children have triumphed over Me."

After this incident, the rabbis under Rabban Gamaliel choose to ostracize Rabbi Eliezer from their community. Rabbi Akiva, a student of Rabbi Eliezer, volunteers to bring this news to Rabbi Eliezer. Rabbi Akiva dresses himself in clothes of mourning, and he delicately says to Rabbi Eliezer, "My teacher, it appears to me that your colleagues are distancing themselves from you." Rabbi Eliezer tears his clothes in mourning and begins to cry.  It was said that Rabbi Eliezer had the power to destroy the whole world, yet due to the respectful manner in which he was ostracized, only a third of the world's crops were destroyed.

When Rabbi Eliezer was given the news of being ostracized, Rabban Gamaliel was on a boat. A great storm picked up, and Rabban Gamaliel knew that this storm was retribution for the pain caused to Rabbi Eliezer. Rabban Gamaliel proclaims to God, "Master of the Universe, it is revealed and known before You that neither was it for my honor that I acted when ostracizing him, nor was it for the honor of the house of my father that I acted; rather, it was for Your honor, so that disputes will not proliferate in Israel." When he spoke these words, the storm was calmed.

Rabbi Eliezer continued to be in grief over being ostracized from the community. His wife, Ima Shalom (the sister of Rabban Gamaliel), was aware of the power that a prayer said in pain had to be heard. She attempted to interfere with her husband's supplication prayers so that any calls for retribution or bemoaning of his fate would not be heard. Yet one day she was distracted and failed to interfere with Rabbi Eliezer's prayers. At this moment, Rabban Gamaliel died. Rabbi Eliezer asked his wife how she knew that this would happen if he were to pray while in such pain. Ima Shalom explains the sentiment expressed in the discussion preceding the story of the Oven of Akhnai, she says, "This is the tradition that I received from the house of the father of my father: All the gates of Heaven are apt to be locked, except for the gates of prayer for victims of verbal mistreatment."

Interpretations
There are many different themes in the story of the Oven of Akhnai. In the backdrop of the story is the status of Judaism prior to Rabban Gamaliel and the views that developed among the late Pharisaic or early Rabbinic Jews.  During the Second Temple period there existed numerous forms of Judaism.  Jewish factions during the Second Temple period harshly denounced one another and sometimes were violent towards each other.  Following the destruction of Jerusalem in 70 CE, the Rabbis pondered why the destruction occurred. The Rabbis concluded that the Second Temple was destroyed due to "baseless hate" (Yoma 9b). In their retelling of the destruction, they point to divisions and a lack of empathy for one another.

The Rabbis under Rabban Gamaliel sought to unify Judaism and end wanton sectarianism. Rabban Gamaliel's school recognized a degree of validity in varying statements, but chose to follow the more lenient philosophy of the school of Hillel. Jewish leaders like Rabban Gamaliel sought to create a cohesive Jewish community where major issues were settled, a system was in place to decide divisive issues, and minor issues could be tolerated.  Rejection of this cooperation and an embrace of sectarianism was condemned in the strongest terms. Rabban Gamaliel himself was known to at times be too forceful in humiliating those who formed divisions.

According to Vered Noam, Rabbi Eliezer sought to reveal an innate halakhah based on revelation and he did not accept proper jurisprudence.  In contrast, Rabban Gamaliel and the other rabbis sought to create halakhah through human reason and utilizing proper jurisprudence. Rabbi Eliezer expresses a differing philosophy regarding halakhah and a rejection of following the jurisprudence upon which a cohesive community relies. The dispute is not simply over an oven, but this is a story which reflects two conflicting ideas over the nature of law and possibilities for destabilizing of the community.  Rabbi Gamaliel expresses his concerns when calming the storm, stating that the reason for his heavy-handed action was "so that disputes will not proliferate in Israel," the very same disputes which resulted in the destruction of Jerusalem in 70 CE.

At the same time, the story is introduced solely on the basis of a discussion of being careful not to hurt another individual through verbal interactions.  Rabban Gamaliel may have had the correct intentions and his philosophies which were necessary for sustaining his community may have won out, yet he still hurt his colleagues through his words and decisions.  While much focus is placed on the accuracy of Rabban Gamaliel's position or Rabbi Joshua's statement, the story in the Talmud does not overlook the fact that Rabban Gamaliel's draconian measures may have gone too far.

Scholar Jeffrey Rubenstein has argued that the Oven of Akhnai focuses on the fact that the majority need to take charge over the minority, but in a way that it is fair to all. The majority needs to work off the minority to attend the needs of everyone in the community. Yet, explains Rubenstein, the midrash says there is a limit to what the majority can do. People should not aim to cause someone to experience pain, but instead respect one another.

Geological interpretation 
Geoarchaeologist Beverly Goodman and historian Henry Abramson theorize that the events mentioned in the story are a mythologized version of the effects of a tsunami in the area caused by the 115 Antioch earthquake.

Influence 
The Oven of Akhnai is one of the best known stories in the Talmud.  As a result of the story, the phrase, "Lo Bashamayim Hi," or, "Not in Heaven," is well known among Jews.  The phrase and story helps to reflect the Jewish view of law, the feasibility of following the Torah, and the importance of every generation to work to understand the Torah.

The story of the Oven of Akhnai is also notable in being one of the stories where a woman is mentioned having learned Torah and expressing her understandings.

Notes

Further reading
 Bava Metzia 59b:1, "The Oven of Akhnai"
 Greenwood, Daniel JH. "Akhnai." Utah L. Rev. (1997): 309.

Talmudic mythology
Ovens